Abdelatif Benazzi (born 20 August 1968) is a French-Moroccan rugby union player who represented both Morocco and France. He played as a lock or back row forward.

Abdel Benazzi started out with his homeland Morocco, but his ability was quickly spotted by France's selectors. He won his first France cap in 1990 against Australia and went on to make 78 appearances and score nine tries for Les Bleus. He played in three World Cups and was a member of the France team that reached the 1999 Rugby World Cup final. He was twice a Grand Slam winner and led Les Bleus in the 1997 tournament. His last international appearance was on 7 April 2001 against England.

He finished his club career with Saracens in England, retiring in 2003 ahead of his 35th birthday.

See also

 Rugby union in Morocco

References

External links

 ERC Rugby profile
 Sporting heroes

1968 births
Living people
French rugby union players
Moroccan rugby union players
French sportspeople of Moroccan descent
Rugby union locks
Rugby union flankers
Saracens F.C. players
France international rugby union players
People from Oujda
Officers of the Ordre national du Mérite
SU Agen Lot-et-Garonne players
Expatriate rugby union players in England
Expatriate rugby union players in Australia
French expatriate rugby union players
Moroccan expatriate rugby union players
Moroccan expatriate sportspeople in England
French expatriate sportspeople in England
French expatriate sportspeople in Australia
Morocco international rugby union players